The 2022 Minnesota State Auditor election was held on November 8, 2022, to elect the state auditor of the U.S. state of Minnesota. Incumbent DFLer Julie Blaha won re-election to a second term.

Blaha was challenged by Republican candidate Ryan Wilson, Grassroot-Legalize Cannabis Party candidate Will Finn, and Legal Marijuana Now Party candidate Tim Davis. 

This election was the second-closest for Minnesota State Auditor ever, and the closest since 1934.

Background 
In Minnesota, the state auditor is charged with supervising and auditing the finances of the state's approximately 4,800 local governments, which altogether tax and spend over $40 billion annually. Likewise, the state auditor performs under contract the annual single audit of nearly $26 billion in federal funds spent by state agencies and their subrecipients. The state auditor's authority transcends jurisdictions and applies to all local governments, be they counties, cities, towns, school districts, local pension funds, metropolitan and regional agencies, or myriad special purpose districts, and to every state agency that receives federal financial assistance.

Nature of the office 
Since the elected constitutional office of state treasurer was eliminated in 2003, and despite the office's importance, the election for state auditor has been considered Minnesota's most "low-key" statewide race. Auditor races are obscure enough to earn headlines when a "real issue" emerges. Other analyses suggest that the auditor's office, which has lost half its staff since the 1990s, is Minnesota's "most overlooked and underfunded statewide office."

Synopsis of incumbent's tenure 

In 2018, Julie Blaha, then secretary-treasurer of the Minnesota AFL–CIO, was elected to replace retiring fellow DFLer Rebecca Otto who unsuccessfully sought the DFL nomination for governor. As state auditor, Blaha was involved in uncovering and investigating a handful of public finance scandals, including an embezzlement scandal in Canton and Whalan and a conflict-of-interest case concerning the mayor of Two Harbors. Auditor Blaha was also publicly critical of Minnesota's civil asset forfeiture laws, arguing they were needlessly punitive for low-income suspects. She led a push to reform the laws which was ultimately successful in 2021.

Candidates 
The primary for State Auditor was uncontested.

Democratic-Farmer-Labor Party 
Julie Blaha, incumbent State Auditor and former secretary-treasurer of the Minnesota AFL–CIO, announced her intention to run for election in November 2021. She won the Democratic-Farmer-Labor Party's endorsement unanimously at the party convention in May 2022.

Nominee 

 Julie Blaha, incumbent State Auditor

Republican Party 
Ryan Wilson, an attorney and former founder and CEO of a Minnesota-based clinical trial auditing firm, announced his candidacy in February 2022. Wilson, of Maple Grove, sought and received the endorsement of the Republican Party of Minnesota in May at the party's state convention.

Nominee 

 Ryan Wilson, attorney, former CEO of Symbios Clinical

Grassroots-Legalize Cannabis Party 
Kevin Finander, who appeared on ballots under the name Will Finn, was the nominee for the Grassroots-Legalize Cannabis Party. A self-described Libertarian, Finander was the chair of the Minnesota Taxation is Theft political action committee and a member of the South St. Paul library board.

Nominee 

 Will Finn, Libertarian, member of the South St. Paul library board

Legal Marijuana Now Party 
Longtime activist and Legal Marijuana Now Party chairman Tim Davis was his party's nominee in 2022. In an interview, Davis acknowledged that Auditor Blaha supported legalizing marijuana, but was committed to running nonetheless, arguing "[DFLers] haven’t gotten anything done. We will be running. If we can get candidates, we will run.”

Nominee 

 Tim Davis, activist

General election

Campaign issues

Feeding Our Future 
Feeding Our Future, a now-dissolved Minnesota nonprofit, defrauded the state's USDA-funded school nutrition programs of at least $250 million over the course of the COVID-19 pandemic. On September 20, 2022, the U.S. Attorney Andrew M. Luger announced federal charges against 47 former Feeding Our Future employees for their involvement in the nation's largest pandemic-related fraud scheme. Republican nominee Ryan Wilson argued that DFL incumbent Auditor Julie Blaha could have minimized the fraud scheme's damage if her office had notified the federal authorities sooner of Feeding Our Future's internal control discrepancies. Auditor Blaha contended that her office is primarily designed for auditing local governments in Minnesota and that her office had submitted a report to the Minnesota Department of Education which noted that Feeding Our Future had not complied with standard auditing practice.

ESG investing 
The Minnesota State Auditor is a member of the State Board of Investment (SBI), which oversees the state's $130 billion investment portfolio. As auditor, Julie Blaha had argued that the state should shift its investing strategies to meet so-called environmental, social, and corporate governance (ESG) guidelines. Blaha had argued that the state is a "long-term investor" that must focus on the potential long-term impacts of climate change and social inequities to maintain a stable investment portfolio. Wilson had argued that ESG investment is inherently political and that SBI should prioritize return on investment as a fiduciary over other public policy considerations, arguing Blaha was looking to "play politics" with state pensions.

Polling 

 Graphical summary

Results

Results by county

Aftermath 
On November 9, the day after the election, Blaha claimed victory in Minnesota's closest race of the year. She released a statement, reading in part: "Our victory is a message that Minnesotans want their auditor to continue to focus on local government, to ultimately protect our freedom to make decisions in our own communities."

Ryan Wilson conceded the same day, saying that he planned to return to practicing law and fundraising for a baseball stadium at Hamel in Medina.

The 8,435-vote margin was slightly above the threshold for an automatic recount.

See also
 2022 Minnesota elections

Notes

References

External links 

 Elections & Voting - Minnesota Secretary of State

 Official campaign websites

 Julie Blaha (DFL)
 Ryan Wilson (R)
 Will Finn (GLC)
 Tim Davis (LMN)

2022 Minnesota elections
Minnesota State Auditor elections
November 2022 events in the United States
Minnesota